Maríano Puricelli (born 25 February 1974) is an Argentine alpine skier. He competed in two events at the 1994 Winter Olympics.

References

External links
 

1974 births
Living people
Argentine male alpine skiers
Olympic alpine skiers of Argentina
Alpine skiers at the 1994 Winter Olympics
Sportspeople from Bariloche